Patrick Finucane may refer to:

 Pat Finucane (1949–1989), Belfast solicitor killed by loyalist paramilitaries in 1989
 Pat Finucane Centre, Northern Irish nationalist advocacy and lobbying entity
 Patrick Finucane (Irish politician) (1890–1984), Irish Clann na Talmhan TD for Kerry North
 Paddy Finucane, World War II hero killed in 1942